In commutative algebra, a quasi-excellent ring is a Noetherian commutative ring that behaves well with respect to the operation of completion, and is called an excellent ring if it is also universally catenary. Excellent rings are one answer to the problem of finding a natural class of "well-behaved" rings containing most of the rings that occur in number theory and algebraic geometry. At one time it seemed that the class of Noetherian rings might be an answer to this problem, but Masayoshi Nagata and others found several strange counterexamples showing that in general Noetherian rings need not be well-behaved: for example, a normal Noetherian local ring need not be analytically normal.  

The class of excellent rings was defined by Alexander Grothendieck (1965) as a candidate for such a class of well-behaved rings. Quasi-excellent rings are conjectured to be the base rings for which the problem of resolution of singularities can be solved;  showed this in characteristic 0, but the positive characteristic case is (as of 2016) still a major open problem. Essentially all Noetherian rings that occur naturally in algebraic geometry or number theory are excellent; in fact it is quite hard to construct examples of Noetherian rings that are not excellent.

Definitions
The definition of excellent rings is quite involved, so we recall the definitions of the technical conditions it satisfies. Although it seems like a long list of conditions, most rings in practice are excellent, such as fields, polynomial rings, complete Noetherian rings, Dedekind domains over characteristic 0 (such as ), and quotient and localization rings of these rings.

Recalled definitions 
A ring  containing a field  is called geometrically regular over  if for any finite extension  of  the ring  is regular.
A ring  is called a G-ring (or Grothendieck ring) if it is Noetherian and its formal fibers  are geometrically regular; this means that for any , the map from the local ring  to its completion is regular in the sense above.
Finally, a ring is J-2 if any finite type -algebra  is J-1, meaning the regular subscheme  is open.

Definition of (quasi-)excellence 
A ring  is called quasi-excellent if it is a G-ring and J-2 ring. It is called excellentpg 214 if it is quasi-excellent and universally catenary. In practice almost all Noetherian rings are universally catenary, so there is little difference between excellent and quasi-excellent rings.

A scheme is called excellent or quasi-excellent if it has a cover by open affine subschemes with the same property, which implies that every open affine subscheme has this property.

Properties 
Because an excellent ring  is a G-ring, it is Noetherian by definition. Because it is universally catenary, every maximal chain of prime ideals has the same length. This is useful for studying the dimension theory of such rings because their dimension can be bounded by a fixed maximal chain. In practice, this means infinite-dimensional Noetherian rings which have an inductive definition of maximal chains of prime ideals, giving an infinite-dimensional ring, cannot be constructed.

Schemes 
Given an excellent scheme  and a locally finite type morphism , then  is excellentpg 217.

Quasi-excellence 
Any quasi-excellent ring is a Nagata ring.

Any quasi-excellent reduced local ring is analytically reduced.

Any quasi-excellent normal local ring is analytically normal.

Examples

Excellent rings
Most naturally occurring commutative rings in number theory or algebraic geometry are excellent. In particular:
All complete Noetherian local rings, for instance all fields and the ring  of -adic integers, are excellent. 
All Dedekind domains of characteristic  are excellent. In particular the ring  of integers is excellent. Dedekind domains over fields of characteristic greater than  need not be excellent. 
Any localization of an excellent ring is excellent.
Any finitely generated algebra over an excellent ring is excellent. This includes all polynomial algebras  with  excellent. This means most rings considered in algebraic geometry are excellent.

A J-2 ring that is not a G-ring

Here is an example of a discrete valuation ring  of dimension  and characteristic  which is  but not a -ring and so is not quasi-excellent. It is a  ring as all Noetherian local rings of dimension at most  are  rings. It is also universally catenary as it is a Dedekind domain. Here  denotes the image of  under the Frobenius morphism .

A G-ring that is not a J-2 ring

Here is an example of a ring that is a G-ring but not a J-2 ring and so not quasi-excellent.
This ring is also universally catenary, as its localization at every prime ideal is a quotient of a regular ring.

A quasi-excellent ring that is not excellent

Nagata's example of a 2-dimensional Noetherian local ring that is catenary but not universally catenary is a G-ring, and is also a J-2 ring as any local G-ring is a J-2 ring . So it is a quasi-excellent catenary local ring that is not excellent.

Resolution of singularities
Quasi-excellent rings are closely related to the problem of resolution of singularities, and this seems to have been Grothendieck's motivationpg 218 for defining them. Grothendieck (1965) observed that if it is possible to resolve singularities of all complete integral local Noetherian rings, then it is possible to resolve the singularities of all reduced quasi-excellent rings. Hironaka (1964) proved this for all complete integral Noetherian local rings over a field of characteristic 0, which implies his theorem that all singularities of excellent schemes over a field of characteristic 0 can be resolved. Conversely if it is possible to resolve all singularities of the spectra of all integral finite algebras over a Noetherian ring R then the ring R is quasi-excellent.

See also 

 Resolution of singularities

References

Alexandre Grothendieck, Jean Dieudonné, Eléments de géométrie algébrique IV  Publications Mathématiques de l'IHÉS 24 (1965), section 7

 
 

Algebraic geometry
Commutative algebra